Verona is a town, an Episcopal see, and the capital city of the Province of Verona in Italy. During the Middle Ages it was the capital and namesake of the March of Verona.

Verona may also refer to:

Places

Europe
 March of Verona, a march of the Holy Roman Empire
 Province of Verona, Italy
 Varniai, a city in Lithuania

United States
 Verona, California, an unincorporated community
 Verona, Kentucky, an unincorporated community and census-designated place
 Verona, Illinois, a village
 Verona, Calhoun County, Michigan, a former unincorporated community
 Verona, Huron County, Michigan, an unincorporated community
 Verona Township, Michigan
 Verona Township, Faribault County, Minnesota
 Verona, Mississippi, a city
 Verona, Missouri, a city
 Verona, Nebraska, an unincorporated community
 Verona, New Jersey, a township
 Verona station (Erie Railroad)
 Verona, New York, a town
 Verona (CDP), New York, a census-designated place
 Verona, North Carolina, a town
 Verona (Jackson, North Carolina), listed on the NRHP in North Carolina
 Verona, North Dakota, a city
 Verona, Ohio, a village
 Verona, Pennsylvania, a borough
 Verona, Tennessee, an unincorporated community
 Verona, Texas, an unincorporated community
 Verona, Virginia, a census-designated place
 Verona, Wisconsin, a city
 Verona (town), Wisconsin
 Verona Island, Maine, a town and the island on which it sits
 Lake Verona, Florida

Canada
 Verona, Ontario

Music
 Verona (band), Venezuelan rock band
 Verona (Czech group), dance music group
 "Verona" (song), the Estonian song for the Eurovision Song Contest 2017, by Koit Toome & Laura Põldvere
 "Verona", a song by the New Zealand band Elemeno P
 "Verona", a song by Heather Nova from Oyster
 "Verona", a song by Muse from the 2022 album Will of the People
 Verona, a 1990 concert film by the Scottish rock band Simple Minds

People
 Verona (name), a list of people with the given name or surname
 Family of Verona, an Italian noble family originally from Verona

Schools
 University of Verona, Verona, Italy
 Verona High School (disambiguation), various schools or school buildings in the United States
 Verona School, a public school building in Verona, Virginia, on the National Register of Historic Places

Transportation
 Verona (steamship), a small steamship of the Puget Sound Mosquito Fleet
 Ford Verona, a small family car based on the Escort
 Suzuki Verona, a mid-sized car, a rebadging of the Daewoo Magnus in the United States

Other uses
 Hellas Verona F.C., an association football club from Verona, Italy
 Battle of Verona (disambiguation)
 85th Volunteer Training Regiment "Verona", a unit of the Italian Army
 Project Verona, an experimental research programming language developed by Microsoft

See also
Venona project, a code-breaking project sometimes misspelled as Verona
Veronese
Veronica (name)